Anna-Liza Mopio-Jane (born 3 December 1986) is a Papua New Guinean swimmer, who specialized in sprint freestyle events. She represented her nation Papua New Guinea at the 2008 Summer Olympics, swimming in the 50 m freestyle. Before her retirement from competitive swimming career in 2012, Mopio-Jane trained for Chandler Swim Club in her current residence Brisbane, Queensland, Australia, under the tutelage of head coach Drew McGregor.

Mopio-Jane was invited by FINA to compete as a lone female swimmer for the Papua New Guinean squad in the 50 m freestyle at the 2008 Summer Olympics in Beijing. Swimming on the outside lane in heat six, Mopio-Jane put up a marvelous swim to hit the wall by nearly three tenths of a second (0.3) behind leader Rugilė Mileišytė of Lithuania, with a second-place time and lifetime best of 26.47; however, she finished outside the semifinal cut in forty-second overall.

References

External links

NBC Olympics Profile

1986 births
Living people
Papua New Guinean female swimmers
Olympic swimmers of Papua New Guinea
Swimmers at the 2008 Summer Olympics
Commonwealth Games competitors for Papua New Guinea
Swimmers at the 2002 Commonwealth Games
Swimmers at the 2006 Commonwealth Games
Swimmers at the 2010 Commonwealth Games
Papua New Guinean female freestyle swimmers
People from the National Capital District (Papua New Guinea)